The Canadian women's national rugby union team have played 39 matches at the Rugby World Cup. They have featured in every edition of the World Cup, from the inaugural tournament in 1991 to the most recent competition in 2017. Canada has never finished a Rugby World Cup ranked lower than sixth. They have made the semi-finals four times and have contested four fifth-place play-offs, winning two and losing two.

Canada's best performance in a World Cup was in 2014 as finalists. It was their first appearance in a World Cup final. They are only the fourth team to reach the final besides England, New Zealand, and the United States.

Canada hosted the 2006 Women's Rugby World Cup.

By position

1991 Rugby World Cup

Knockout stage

1994 Rugby World Cup

Knockout stage

1998 Rugby World Cup

Knockout stage

2002 Rugby World Cup

Knockout stage

2006 Rugby World Cup 

Pool A ⇔ Pool D

Knockout stage

2010 Rugby World Cup

Knockout stage

2014 Rugby World Cup

Knockout stage

2017 Rugby World Cup

Knockout stage

Overall record 
Overall record against all nations in the World Cup:

References

External links 

 Official site of the Rugby World Cup.
 Official site of World Rugby.

 
World Cup